The Story of Them Featuring Van Morrison is a compilation album, that includes almost every song recorded by the Northern Irish band Them, during the two-year history of the band when it featured Van Morrison as the vocalist for the group.

Track listing
All songs written by Van Morrison except as noted

Disc 1

  "The Story of Them" [Parts 1 & 2] – 7:18
  "Don't Start Crying Now"  (Moore, West) – 2:03
  "Gloria" 2:35 (stereo)
  "Philosophy" – 2:35
  "One Two Brown Eyes" – 2:34 (stereo)
  "Baby, Please Don't Go"  (Williams) – 2:40
  "Here Comes the Night" (Berns) – 2:46 (stereo)
  "All for Myself"  – 2:47
   "One More Time" – 2:48
   "Little Girl – 2:47
   "I Gave My Love a Diamond" (Berns) – 3:02
   "Go on Home Baby" (Berns) – 2:32 (stereo)
   "My Little Baby"  (Berns, Farrell)  – 2:00 (stereo)
   "Mystic Eyes" – 2:41 (rechanneled)
   "Don't Look Back" (Hooker) – 3:20 (rechanneled+)
   "If You and I Could Be as Two" – 2:51 (stereo)
   "I Like It Like That" – 3:16 (rechanneled+)
   "I'm Gonna Dress in Black" (Gillon aka Tommy Scott) – 3:29 (stereo)
   "(Get Your Kicks On) Route 66" (Troup) – 2:22 (rechanneled+)
   "Just a Little Bit" (Gordon) – 2:21
   "You Just Can't Win" – 2:21
   "Bright Lights, Big City" (Reed) – 2:30
   "Baby What You Want Me to Do" (Reed) – 3:26
   "I'm Gonna Dress in Black"  (Gillon) – 3:34 [Alternate Mix]
   "One More Time" – 2:45 [US Version – Stereo Mix] (stereo)
   "Little Girl" – 2:47 [Alternate Version] (rechanneled+)

 UK release contains a different take of "I Gave My Love A Diamond". It also omits the alternate version of "Little Girl"

Disc 2

All songs written by Van Morrison except as noted
   "How Long Baby"  (Gillon) – 3:37
   "(It Won't Hurt) Half As Much" (Berns) – 3:01 (stereo)
   "Something You Got" (Kenner) – 2:31
   "Call My Name" (Scott) – 2:20
   "Turn On Your Love Light" (Malone, Scott) – 2:19 (rechanneled++)
   "I Put a Spell on You"  (Hawkins) – 2:36
   "I Got A Woman"  (Charles) – 3:12
   "Out of Sight" (Wright, Brown) – 2:21
    "It's All Over Now, Baby Blue" (Dylan)  – 3:47
    "Bad Or Good" – 2:06
    "Hello Josephine" (Domino, Bartholomew) – 2:04
    "Don't You Know"  (Scott) – 2:22
    "Hey Girl" – 3:00
    "Bring 'em on In" 3:13
    "Times Gettin' Tougher Than Tough" (Witherspoon) – 2:12 (rechanneled+++)
   "Stormy Monday"  (Walker) – 2:40 (rechanneled+++)
    "Friday's Child" – 3:27
    "Richard Cory"  (Simon) – 2:43
    "My Lonely Sad Eyes" – 2:28 (rechanneled)
    "I Can Only Give You Everything" (Scott/Coulter)– 2:39 (rechanneled++)
    "Could You, Would You" – 3:08
    "Bring 'em on In" – 3:41 [US Version 2]
    "Richard Cory" (Simon) – 3:47  Version 2 (stereo)
    "Call My Name" (Scott) – 2:18 [Version 2]

(In regards to the rechanneled tracks, + indicates sides using the Parrot rechanneled mixes with non-original added percussion, probably done for the 2LP Parrot anthology from the 1970s, ++ indicates sides using the Parrot rechanneled mixes from the second album, and +++ indicates demos that were slightly rechanneled when issued on LP in the 1960s in Germany, and they did not have the mono mixes available.)

Notes on the album sleeve
Note: The Demo "Mighty Like a Rose" has been excluded from this album
Package design: Phil Smee at Waldo's Design & Dream Emporium
Digitally re-mastered from the original analogue masters by Jon Astley

References

External links
[ All Music biography] Them
 EclecticParrot Review

Them (band) albums
Van Morrison compilation albums
1997 compilation albums
Deram Records compilation albums